Joanna Kitlinski (born 5 July 1988) is an American rugby union player. Kitlinski plays for Sale Sharks in the Premier 15s. She previously played for Exeter Chiefs in 2021.

Biography 
Kitlinski ran track and cross-country in high school. She began playing rugby at Grand Valley State University when her roommate invited her to practice.

Kitlinski played on the Collegiate All-American team from 2010 to 2011. She then competed in the Women's Premier League for the Glendale Merlins, she won three national titles and was MVP in 2015. She debuted for the United States in July 2015 against Canada.

Kitlinski was named in the Eagles squad for the 2022 Pacific Four Series in New Zealand. She was selected in the Eagles squad for the 2021 Rugby World Cup in New Zealand.

References

External links 

 Eagles Profile

Living people
1988 births
Female rugby union players
American female rugby union players
United States women's international rugby union players